Charles Burls (8 March 1847 – 17 December 1923) was an English cricketer. He played seventeen first-class matches for Surrey between 1873 and 1887.

See also
 List of Surrey County Cricket Club players

References

External links
 

1847 births
1923 deaths
C. I. Thornton's XI cricketers
Cricketers from Surrey
English cricketers
Gentlemen of England cricketers
Orleans Club cricketers
Surrey cricketers
W. G. Grace's XI cricketers